is a commuter railway station on the Enoshima Electric Railway (Enoden) located in the Yuigahama neighborhood of the city of Kamakura, Kanagawa Prefecture, Japan.

Lines
Yuigahama Station is served by the Enoshima Electric Railway Main Line and is 8.9 kilometers from the terminus of the line at Fujisawa Station.

Station layout
The station consists of a single side platform serving bi-directional traffic. The station is unattended.

Platforms

History 
Yuigahama Station was opened on 16 August 1907.

Station numbering was introduced to the Enoshima Electric Railway January 2014 with Yuigahama being assigned station number EN13.

Passenger statistics
In fiscal 2019, the station was used by an average of 2,449 passengers daily, making it the 11th used of the 15 Enoden stations 

The average passenger figures for previous years (boarding passengers only) are as shown below.

Surrounding area
Amanawa Jinja
Yuigahama Beach

See also
 List of railway stations in Japan

References

External links

Enoden station information 

Railway stations in Kanagawa Prefecture
Railway stations in Japan opened in 1907
Kamakura, Kanagawa